Chapli may refer to
Çəpli, a town in Azerbaijan
Chapli, an Indian form of sandal or slipper
Chapli kebab, a type of kebab originating from Peshawar, Pakistan